Katrina Adams and Zina Garrison were the defending champions and won in the final 6–3, 6–4 against Gigi Fernández and Lori McNeil.

Seeds
Champion seeds are indicated in bold text while text in italics indicates the round in which those seeds were eliminated.

 Gigi Fernández /  Lori McNeil (final)
 Katrina Adams /  Zina Garrison (champions)
 Penny Barg /  Elise Burgin (quarterfinals)
 Lise Gregory /  Gretchen Magers (first round)

Draw

External links
 1989 Virginia Slims of Houston Doubles Draw

Virginia Slims of Houston
1989 WTA Tour